Tregonwell is a surname of English origin.

List of people with the surname 

 Lewis Tregonwell (1758–1832), founder of Bournemouth
 John Tregonwell (died 1682), Member of Parliament for Corfe Castle
 John Tregonwell (died 1565), English jurist, a principal agent of Henry VIII and Thomas Cromwell

See also 

 Tregonwell Frampton (1641–12 March 1727), English racehorse trainer
 Tregonwell Academy
 Trégon

Surnames
English masculine given names
Surnames of English origin
Surnames of British Isles origin